Karel Pott (20 August 1904 – 16 December 1953) was a Portuguese sprinter. He competed in the men's 100 metres event at the 1924 Summer Olympics.

References

External links
 

1904 births
1953 deaths
Sportspeople from Maputo
Athletes (track and field) at the 1924 Summer Olympics
Portuguese male sprinters
Olympic athletes of Portugal

Portuguese people of Dutch descent